Jônatas Domingos, or simply Jônatas (born July 29, 1982 in Fortaleza, CE), is former Brazilian footballer who played as a defensive midfielder.

Career
A skillful defensive midfielder, Jônatas came from Flamengo's youth team and played professionally for the club from 2002 until 2006. He is recognizably a tactically obedient player with good technical ability which usually allows him to create attacking opportunities for his teammates and even himself.

Flamengo predicted a successful future for Jônatas if he was able to stop committing foolish fouls and complaining about referees' decisions. This was the case and the player was awarded with both his first Brazil call up (for a friendly against Norway in August 2006 which also happened to be coach Dunga's debut with the squad) and a move to European club Espanyol with whom he signed a three-year contract as of August 2006. In May 2007, he scored an equalizer while his team was playing with ten men against Sevilla deep into extra time to take the UEFA Cup final to penalties, but subsequently missed his kick as Sevilla went on to become only the second team after Real Madrid to retain the trophy.

In December 2006, Jônatas's  father José Lourenço de Souza was kidnapped, after Robinho's family.

Career statistics
(Correct 

Honours
Flamengo
Taça Guanabara: 2004, 2008
Taça Rio: 2009
Rio de Janeiro State League: 2004, 2008, 2009
Copa do Brasil: 2006

References

External links
CBF 
Player Profile 
ogol.com.br 

1982 births
Living people
Brazilian footballers
Brazilian expatriate footballers
CR Flamengo footballers
La Liga players
RCD Espanyol footballers
Botafogo de Futebol e Regatas players
Figueirense FC players
Boavista Sport Club players
Sportspeople from Fortaleza
Expatriate footballers in Spain

Association football midfielders